Ludwig Heinrich von Buchholtz (1740–1811) was a Prussian diplomat. He was the Prussian ambassador to Poland from 1780 to 1789 and again 1792 to 1794 (in the meantime, he was replaced by Girolamo Lucchesini). He was instrumental in the signing of the Polish-Prussian alliance.

1740 births
1811 deaths
Ambassadors of Prussia
18th-century diplomats
Ambassadors to Poland